The 2019 World Seniors Championship was a snooker tournament, that took place from 15 to 18 August 2019 at the Crucible Theatre in Sheffield, England. It was the first event of the 2019–20 World Seniors Tour. It was the tenth World Seniors Championship, first held in 1991. The event had a total prize fund of £63,500 up from £18,000 the previous year, with £15,000 more for the winner, at £25,000.

Aaron Canavan was the defending champion, having won the 2018 edition with a 4–3 victory against Patrick Wallace in the final. However, he lost 3–1 to Leo Fernandez in the quarter finals. Jimmy White won the title, defeating Darren Morgan 5–3 in the final.

Overview

The World Seniors Championship is a snooker tournament that first took place in 1991. The event is open to players over 40 who are not in the top 64 of the world rankings. The 2019 event took place from 15 to 18 August 2019 at the Crucible Theatre in Sheffield, England. It was the first event of the 2019–20 World Seniors Tour and the 10th edition of the World Seniors Championship. The event featured 20 participants, with matches being contested as the best-of-5 , until the final, which was a best-of-9. Aaron Canavan was the defending champion, having won the 2018 edition with a 4–3 victory against Patrick Wallace in the final.

Prize fund 
The breakdown of the tournament prizes is shown below:
 Winner: £25,000
 Runner-up: £10,000
 Semi-finalist: £7,500
 Quarter-finalist: £3,000
 Highest break: £1,500
 Total: £63,500

Participants
Fourteen players were invited to play at the event, ten by the WPBSA and four by continental governing bodies:

 Aaron Canavan (defending champion)
 Jimmy White
 Joe Johnson
 Stephen Hendry
 John Parrott
 Cliff Thorburn
 Dennis Taylor
 Tony Drago
 Tony Knowles
 Willie Thorne
 James Wattana
 Darren Morgan (European Billiard Snooker Association nomination)
 Wael Talaat (Asian Billiard Snooker Federation nomination) Replaced by Mohammed Abdelkader
 Chen Gang (Chinese Billiard Snooker Association nomination)
 Dene O'Kane (Oceanic Billiard Snooker Federation nomination)
In addition, six qualifying events took place during the World Seniors Tour 2018–19, with winners receiving a place at the event.

 WSC Q1 2–4 November: Crucible Sports Club, Newbury, England 
 Qualifier: Rhydian Richards
 WSC Q2 16–18 November: Route es Nouaux, Jersey
 Qualifier: Stuart Watson
 WSC Q3 7–9 December: Corner Bank Sports Bar & Grill, Toronto, Canada
 Qualifier: Joris Maas
 WSC Q4 14–16 December: Frames Sports Bar, Coulsdon, Surrey, England
 Qualifier: Leo Fernandez
 WSC Q5 12–14 January: CBSA World Snooker Academy, Beijing, China
 Qualifier: Au Chi-wai
 WSC Q6 25–27 January: Q Ball Snooker and Pool, Houston, Texas, United States
 Qualifier: Igor Figueiredo

Summary
The first two rounds were played on 15 and 16 August 2019 as the best of 5 frames. Four matches were held as qualifiers to reach the last 16. Both James Wattana and Darren Morgan won their matches 3–0, with Wattana making the only century break of the tournament, a 113 in the opening frame. Chinese player Chen Gang and Maltese player Tony Drago also qualified after 3–1 and 3–2 victories. Three of the four would also win their second round match, with Chen defeating Cliff Thorburn, Morgan defeating John Parrott and Wattana completing a whitewash over Joe Johnson. Leo Fernandez and Stephen Hendry also completed second round 3–0 whitewash victories over Joris Maas and Drago, respectively.

The quarter-finals were held on 17 August as the best of five frames. Fernandez completed a 3–1 victory over defending champion Canavan, White defeated Stuart Watson 3–2 whilst Wattana defeated Gang and Morgan defeated Hendry 3–1. The quarter-finals were prefaced by a women's exhibition four player tournament, won by Reanne Evans. The semi-finals, played on 18 August were held between White and Wattana, and Morgan and Fernandez. White won his match 3-1 before Morgan completed a 3-0 victory in the second semi-final.

The final was played on 19 August as the best of nine frames. Morgan won the opening frame, before White made a break of 55 to win the second. White took a 3-2 lead after a break of 53 in frame five. Morgan took frame six to tie the match before White made the highest break of the final, an 86. White took the next frame to complete a 5-3 victory and win the event for the second time. Having lost the World Snooker Championship final at the venue six times, this was the first tournament that White had won at the Crucible Theatre.

Main draw 
The draw for the event is shown below. Players in bold denote match winners.

Final

Century breaks
There was only one century break made during the event, James Wattana made a 113 in the first round.

References

External links
2019 Rokit Seniors World Championship 2019 at the WPBSA Tournament Manager

2019
World Seniors Tour
2019 in snooker
August 2019 sports events in the United Kingdom